Grange Road is an arterial road in the western suburbs of Adelaide, South Australia. It runs from the coast at Grange to South Road, close to the city centre.

Route
Grange Road commences from Esplanade at Grange, on the Adelaide foreshore, and heads east, crossing Tapleys Hill Road between Seaton and Fulham Gardens, and the East Avenue-Holbrooks Road dog-leg through Flinders Park, before eventually ending at the intersection with South Road in West Hindmarsh.

The eastern end of Grange Road crosses the North-South Motorway trench as Manton Street, which passes Hindmarsh Stadium, behind the Adelaide Entertainment Centre, then joins the City Ring Route at Port Road and Park Terrace via a short stretch of Adam Street.

History
Between 1894 and 1957, the Henley Beach railway line followed the west side of Military Road and crossed what is now Grange Road. The Kirkcaldy railway station was immediately south of Grange Road.

The 1936 Gregory's street directory shows that west of Tapleys Hill Road, Grange Road continued as Kircaldy Beach Road, and the area where it ended was known at that time as Kircaldy. The 1940 Fuller's directory shows Grange Road to the bridge over the Port River and Kirkcaldy Road from there to the Esplanade. Today, the bridge is just a culvert or stormwater drain, and there is only an open channel for the river downstream (north) of Grange Road.

Major intersections
Grange Road is entirely contained within the City of Charles Sturt local government area.

References

Roads in Adelaide